Aspire Academy is a sports academy based in the Aspire Zone in Qatar, founded in 2004 with the goal to scout and help develop Qatari athletes, whilst also providing them with secondary school education.

History

Aspire Academy was established by an Emiri Decree, No. 16 of 2004, as an independent government-funded agency that reported directly to the Emir Sheikh Hamad Bin Khalifa Al-Thani through the Heir Apparent Sheikh Tamim Bin Hamad Al-Thani.

Later, an Emiri Decree – No.1 of 2008 – incorporated the Aspire Academy as a strategic business unit (SBU) into the new, parent organization of Aspire Zone Foundation. Despite the switch from an independent government body to an SBU, the original purpose and objectives of the Aspire Academy remained the same.

On 17 November 2005, the Emir Sheikh Hamad Bin Khalifa Al-Thani led an opening ceremony of the Aspire Dome, essentially signaling the global announcement of Aspire Academy as an international institute of high standing. Over the years, it has received international recognition.

Aspire own Spanish team Cultural Leonesa and Belgian team K.A.S. Eupen. In August 2017, Spanish side Atlético Astorga FC announced links with Aspire Academy. The link up saw some Aspire based players join the club. As of 3 January 2018, Aspire also have an official partnership with Leeds United in England. They also have a satellite academy in the African country of Senegal.

In January 2019 and January 2020 the complex hosted the Match Premier Cup friendly tournament.

Achievements

Football 
In 2014, the Qatar U-19 national football team, composed solely of Aspire Academy student-athletes, won the 38th edition of the AFC U-19 Championship in Myanmar, for the first time in Qatar's history. With the same Aspire players, the senior side managed to conquer the nation's first ever AFC Asian Cup in 2019 edition.

Athletics 
 Mutaz Essa Barshim, high jumper, has been the 2014 World Indoor Champion, the 2017 and 2019 World Champion and a 2020 Summer Olympics gold medalist, besides holding the Asian record and second best outdoor high jump in history. set during the 2014 Diamond League.
 Abdulla Al-Tamimi, professional squash player, was also a footballer scouted by Al Sadd SC at the Aspire Academy, is the Qatari number 1 and the world number 28.
 Ashraf El Seify, hammer thrower, graduated from Aspire Academy in 2014, won a gold medal at the 2012 Asian Junior Athletics Championships and 2012 World Junior Athletics Championships setting a new World Junior Record and World Youth Best. In 2014, Ashraf became the 1st athlete to successfully defend his title at the IAAF World Junior Championships.

Controversies
There have been several controversies regarding the academy. One such controversy is the allegation that Qatar bought votes to host the 2022 FIFA World Cup with the academy, with critics stating that Aspire sent scouts to Thailand and Guatemala, countries with little footballing history, due to both countries having representation on the FIFA Executive Committee. The Aspire Football Dreams initiative was started by the Aspire Academy to find hidden talent in the most remote villages and outposts of the globe such as Guatemala. In order to identify young talent and give them a chance to develop in this field and build a profession out of it, it invited kids to take part in football games and matches. The chief scout, Josep Colomer, who is renowned for bringing Lionel Messi and Thierry Henry to Barcelona, revealed this in a 2010 interview with ESPN. The Aspire Academy initiative aims to provide Qatari athletes with the most cutting-edge equipment and resources possible as part of the country's goals and policies. 

In addition, Paraguay, one of the countries with a recently opened program, is home to CONMEBOL president Nicolas Leoz. The statements were denied by Qatar.

Most notably, there have been many allegations that Qatar plans to assimilate academy players into their 2022 World Cup squad. This is bolstered by Qatar's lenient policy on naturalization of athletes for sports.

See also
Sport in Qatar

References

External links

 
Football academies in Asia
Sports organisations of Qatar
Educational organisations based in Qatar
Youth sport in Qatar
2004 establishments in Qatar
Venues of the 2006 Asian Games
National football academies